Tuvana Türkay (born 3 October 1990) is a Turkish actress.

Early life
Türkay was born on 3 October 1990 in Üsküdar, Istanbul, Turkey. She studied at Beykent University in the Department of Radio, Television and Cinema.

Her older sister, Katre Türkay, is also a model and an actress.

Filmography

Film

TV series

Discography 
Singles
 "Yalan De" (2019)
 "Ah Aşk" (2021)
 "Geceler" (2022)

Books 
 İkimiz de Beni Seviyoruz, Artemis Publishing (2020)

References

1990 births
Living people
Turkish film actresses
Turkish television actresses